Forlì Football Club is an Italian association football club based in Forlì, Emilia-Romagna, that competes in the Serie D, the fourth tier of Italian football.

History

From the foundation to 2007 

The original club, called Foot-Ball Club Forlì, was founded in 1919, and was last in Serie B of Northern Italy in 1947. Later, the name changed into Associazione Calcio Forlì. Forlì placed last in 2005–06 Serie C2 season, being relegated to Serie D, but was excluded by the federation because of financial troubles. The historical club was put in the Terza Categoria division with the new name ASD Nuovo Forlì 1919.

From 2007 to today 
In July 2007 football in Forlì was reborn as Football Club Forlì Dilettantistica which became the heir of the old F.C. Forlì, with the acquisition of sports title of the former second club of the city: the ASD AC Sporting Forlì.

After a season in Promozione, two in Eccellenza and two in Serie D in 2012 the club was promoted to Lega Pro Seconda Divisione.

Colors and badge 
Its colors are white and red.

External links 
Official site

Football clubs in Italy
Football clubs in Emilia-Romagna
Association football clubs established in 1919
Forlì
Serie C clubs
Serie B clubs
Serie D clubs
1919 establishments in Italy
Companies based in the Province of Forlì-Cesena
Sport in Forlì